Mavis Meets Shorty is an album by vocalist Mavis Rivers and trumpeter Shorty Rogers, released on the Reprise label in 1963.

Reception

Allmusic awarded the album 3 stars.

Track listing 
 "I Remember You" (Victor Schertzinger, Johnny Mercer) – 2:07
 "You Brought a New Kind of Love to Me" (Sammy Fain, Irving Kahal, Pierre Norman) – 2:59
 "When Sunny Gets Blue" (Jack Segal, Marvin Fischer) – 2:23
 "Nothing But the Best" (Johnny Rotella) – 2:43
 "I Feel So Smoochie" (Phil Moore) – 2:34
 "Im Gonna Live Till I Die" (Al Hoffman, Walter Kent, Manny Curtis) – 3:07
 "The Best Is Yet to Come" (Cy Coleman, Carolyn Leigh) – 2:33
 "I've Got You Under My Skin" (Cole Porter) – 3:02
 "Slightly Out of Tune (Desafinado)" (Antônio Carlos Jobim, Newton Mendonça, Jon Hendricks, Jessie Cavanaugh) – 2:14
 "My Shining Hour" (Harold Arlen, Johnny Mercer) – 1:48
 "By Myself" (Arthur Schwartz, Howard Dietz) – 1:56
 "Get Out of Town" (Porter) – 2:08

Personnel 
Mavis Rivers – vocals
Shorty Rogers – trumpet
Unidentified orchestra and string section arranged and conducted by Chuck Sagle including:
Red Callender – tuba
Richard Grove – piano

References 

Shorty Rogers albums
1963 albums
Reprise Records albums
Albums arranged by Shorty Rogers